25th Anniversary Tour "On the Wing" in Tokyo is a live video by Japanese singer/songwriter Mari Hamada, released on April 15, 2009 by Meldac/Tokuma Japan on DVD. The video was recorded live on December 7, 2008 at the C.C. Lemon Hall as the final show of Hamada's 25th anniversary tour.

The video peaked at No. 20 on Oricon's DVD chart.

Track listing

Personnel 
 Takashi Masuzaki (Dimension) – guitar
 Yōichi Fujii – guitar
 Tomonori "You" Yamada – bass
 Satoshi "Joe" Miyawaki – drums
 Takanobu Masuda – keyboards
 Masafumi Nakao – keyboards, sound effects
 ERI (Eri Hamada) – backing vocals

Charts

References

External links 
  (Mari Hamada)
 Official website (Tokuma Japan)
 

2009 live albums
2009 video albums
Japanese-language live albums
Live video albums
Mari Hamada video albums
Tokuma Shoten albums